David Cushman Coyle (1887–1969) was an American structural engineer, economist, and writer. Coyle was the structural engineer of the Washington State Capitol and a prominent economic thinker during the New Deal.

Early life
David Cushman Coyle was born in 1887. His parents were John Patterson Coyle, a Congregational minister, and Mary Cushman Coyle. His sister was Grace Coyle (1892–1962).

Career

Coyle was a structural engineer, economist and writer.

Personal life and death
Coyle had two sons, and a daughter by his first wife. He was married to Doris Porter Coyle upon his death. He resided in Washington, D.C. and Cliff Island, Portland, Maine, and vacationed in Cape Porpoise, Maine. He was a member of the Cosmos Club in Washington, D.C. He died in 1969 in Washington, D.C.

Selected works
 Uncommon Sense, (1936)
 America, (1941), published by National Home Library Foundation 
 Tolerance and Treason, The Yale Review, (Spring 1948)
 The United States Political System and How it Works, (1957)
 The United Nations and How It Works, (1965)
 Roads to a New America, (1969)

References

External links 
 

1887 births
1969 deaths
20th-century American economists
American economics writers
American male non-fiction writers
20th-century American engineers
American political writers
Place of birth missing
20th-century American male writers